"Studio" is a song by American hip hop recording artist Schoolboy Q, released on April 22, 2014 by Top Dawg Entertainment and Interscope Records, as the third official single from his third studio album, Oxymoron (2014). The song, which features vocals from American singer and songwriter BJ the Chicago Kid, was recorded in 2013 and produced by American record producer Swiff D.

Music video
The song's music video, directed by Jerome D, was released on April 22, 2014.

Remix
The official remix features a verse by American rapper Nas.

Commercial performance
The song peaked at number 38 on the US Billboard Hot 100 chart, becoming his highest-charting single on that chart as a lead artist. It also topped the US Hot R&B/Hip-Hop Airplay chart. It appeared on the Billboard Hot 100 year-end chart at number 96 despite only peaking at number 38, making it the fourth lowest-peaking song to be included on the Billboard Hot 100 year-end chart. The song has been certified double platinum by the Recording Industry Association of America (RIAA) for sales and streams of over 2 million units.

Awards and nominations

Charts

Weekly charts

Year-end charts

Certifications

Release history

References

2013 songs
2014 singles
Schoolboy Q songs
Top Dawg Entertainment singles
Interscope Records singles
Songs written by Schoolboy Q
Songs written by BJ the Chicago Kid
Black-and-white music videos